William Dennis  was Anglican priest in Ireland in the 18th century.

Dennis was educated at Trinity College Dublin.  A Prebendary of Kilrossanty in Lismore Cathedral, Ireland, he was appointed Archdeacon of Lismore in 1723. He died in June 1749 and is buried in the grounds of Waterford Cathedral.

References

Alumni of Trinity College Dublin
Irish Anglicans
Archdeacons of Lismore
1749 deaths
18th-century Irish Anglican priests